Sunniva Lindgård, better known as Sassy 009, is a Scandinavian musician originally from Oslo, Norway.

History
The name Sassy 009 comes from Lindgård's SoundCloud username. Sassy 009 originally began as a trio that consisted of Sunniva Lindgård, Teodora Georgijević, and Johanna Scheie Orellana. The three members originally met in high school. As a trio, they released one EP together, titled Do You Mind, in 2017. In May 2018, the trio was featured as The Guardians "Ones to Watch". In August 2019, a  new song titled "Thrasher" was released. In October 2019, The Fader premiered a new song from Sassy 009, stating that Lindgård is the only member currently involved in the project.

DiscographyEPs Do You Mind (2017) Albums''' 
 Kill Sassy 009 (2019) 
 Heart Ego'' (2021)

References

Musicians from Oslo